Magé is a municipality located in the Brazilian state of Rio de Janeiro.

Magepe-Mirim was established in 1566 by Portuguese colonists. It is considered to be a calm place, especially compared to nearby Rio.

Politics
In the October 5th, 2008 municipal elections, Núbia Cozzolino was re-elected mayor with 51% of the vote but had her mandate revoked in 2009 after being impeached on various corruption charges. She was succeeded by her deputy Rozan Gomes who was also impeached resulting in a by-election. On 31 July 2011, Nestor Vidal of PMDB won with 68.62% of the vote.

Geography
Magé borders Petrópolis to the north, Duque de Caxias to west, Guapimirim to the east and Guanabara Bay to the south.

The climate is tropical throughout the municipality, except in areas near the Serra dos Órgãos with a subtropical highland climate.

The municipality contains part of the Central Rio de Janeiro Atlantic Forest Mosaic , created in 2006. It also contains the  Suruí Environmental Protection Area.

Demographics

According to then-mayor Nestor Vidal, the high index of growth in population is caused by low taxes and low prices of homes in the city. As of 2020, the population is 246,433, up from the approx. 90,000 in the 1960s. According to the 2009 census, whites constituted 15.2% of the demographic makeup, browns (mulatos) were 66.6%, and blacks were 19.1%. Other races represented 0.01% of the population in Magé. Class A population was 1.5%, Class B 46.2%, Class C 47.1% and Class D 6.2%. This indicates the index of poverty is high in the city; more than 55% are living in the poverty line in Magé.

Notable people
The Brazilian Internationally well known soccer player Mané Garrincha was born in Magé (Pau Grande) in October 28, 1933.

References

Sources

Municipalities in Rio de Janeiro (state)
Guanabara Bay
Populated coastal places in Rio de Janeiro (state)
Populated places established in 1566